Hotel Torni is a historical hotel located in Kamppi, Helsinki, Finland, and a part of the Sokos Hotels hotel chain. When opened in 1931, it became the tallest building in Finland, a position it maintained until the completion of the new Neste headquarters in neighboring Espoo in 1976. It remained the tallest building in Helsinki until it was overtaken by Itäkeskuksen maamerkki in 1987. The interior of the building was completely renovated in 2005. It is located in central Helsinki, in the so-called Helsinki Design District.

History
The hotel was designed by architects Jung & Jung in 1928, and has 14 stories. It is allegedly the place where the murder of the Mata Hari-like Minna Craucher was planned in 1932.

The hotel served the needs of air defense during the Second World War, when members of the Finnish women's paramilitary organization Lotta Svärd used it as a watchtower to spot Soviet bombers. Immediately after the cessation of the war, Hotelli Torni served as the headquarters of the Allied Control Commission monitoring Finnish compliance with the obligations of the Moscow Armistice. It became known as a center of culinary excellence.

Restaurants
In Hotel Torni, there are several restaurants including Ravintola Torni (dining), Ateljee Bar (top of the tower with view over downtown Helsinki, known especially for the toilets which have scenic glass walls to the outside), American Bar (American style bar), and O'Malley's (Irish bar).  The Ateljee Bar provides a monthly changing art exhibition featuring Finnish artists.

See also
 List of tallest buildings in Finland
 Hotel Kämp
 Hotel Marski
 Palace Hotel

External links

 Sokos Hotel Torni: history
 A video starring Hotel Torni
 Helsinki Design District
 Ateljee Bar Artist of the Month

Torni
Torni
Hotel buildings completed in 1931
Skyscrapers in Finland
Skyscraper hotels